Darebu Cuo or Darab Co or Tarap Tso or Darebu Lake is a high-altitude alpine lake in Tibet, China.

Location 

China National Highway 317 passes through the south bank of the lake. And just below that road, another small alpine lake Oma Tso is located.

Flora and fauna 
In 2015, scientists from the Chinese Academy of Forestry found that the lake's ecosystem hosts seven species and has a diversity index of 2.1. The most prominent species of the ecosystem is Bar-headed Goose.

References 

Lakes of Tibet